Hon Yaya Bauchi Tongo is a businessman and politician representing the Gombe/Kwami/Funakaye Constituency in the House of Representatives of Nigeria.

Early life and education
 Hon Yaya Bauchi Tongo was born in 1963 in Funakaye Local Government Area of Gombe State. Hon Tango attended elementary and secondary schools, earning the First School Leaving Certificate (FSLC) and Senior School Certificate (SSCE) in turn. He then went to college and graduated with a B.Tech. in business management.

Political Career

Hon Tango was formerly the honorable chairman of the Funakaye Local Government Council and a special adviser to the Gombe State Government. He was also chosen to serve in the Gombe State House of Assembly. He was elected as a member House or Representatives, representing Gombe/Kwami/Funakaye in the 2023 general election

References

Members of the House of Representatives (Nigeria)
1963 births
Politicians from Gombe State
Living people